Andrzej Adam Zaorski (17 December 1942 – 31 October 2021) was a Polish actor and cabaret artist, appearing in television, film and theater, as well as on the radio.

Biography 
Zaorski was born in Piaski, Poland. He graduated from the Aleksander Zelwerowicz National Academy of Dramatic Art in Warsaw in 1964 and made his debut at the theatre on 31 January 1965. He performed at the Warsaw Contemporary Theatre until 1970, then at the Ateneum Theatre, National Theatre, Powszechny Theatre, "On Targówku" theatre and Square theatre, and the U Lopka, Pod Egidą, "Tu 60-tka" and "Kaczuch Show" cabarets. In the 1970s, he participated in productions of regular television programs (including Gallux Show and Studio Gama) and radio (60 minut na godzinę). In 1991, he received the Wiktora award for television personality.

From 1991 to 1993, he created the TV series Polskie Zoo.

In the early 1990s, Zaorski retired from active work in theater and film, though at the end of this decade and in the early 2000s, he starred in several TV series, as well as an amateur director. He suffered a stroke in 2004, causing paralysis and significantly reducing his ability to speak with his almost-synonymous voice. Issued in 2006, he wrote an autobiographical novel, Ręka, noga, mózg na ścianie, in which he described the process of recovery from the stroke.

He was a part of the radio novel W Jezioranach.

Selected filmography 

1964: Pięciu .... Staszek
1966: Marysia i Napoleon .... Porajski - Marysia's Friend
1966: Małżeństwo z rozsądku .... Artist
1967: The Night of the Generals .... German Radiotelegraphist (uncredited)
1967: Westerplatte .... Lt. Zdzisław Kręgielski
1967: Stawka większa niż życie .... Romek Górski
1967: Paryż - Warszawa bez wizy
1968: Dynamit in grüner Seide
1968: Ostatni po Bogu .... Martula
1969: Zbrodniarz, który ukradł zbrodnie .... Journalist (voice)
1970: Album polski .... Anna's Friend
1970: Raj na ziemi .... Wiktor Szarówka
1971: Epilog norymberski
1972: Uciec jak najbliżej .... Colleague
1972: Bolesław Śmiały .... Grzegorz, King's knight
1974: Ile jest życia (TV Series) .... Jerzy Janas
1977: Wielka podróż Bolka i Lolka .... Sprawozdawca (voice)
1977: Lalka .... Julian Ochocki
1979: Skradziona kolekcja .... Głazik
1980: Nasze podwórko .... Tomek's father
1985: Baryton .... Ryszard Domagala
1987: The Mother of Kings
1987: Maskarada .... Cabaret Manager
1988: Śmierć Johna L. .... Stefan Nowak
1989: Piłkarski poker .... president of the 'Koks' Wałbrzych football club
1991: Panny i wdowy .... painter Henryk, Maria's husband
2003: Sprawa na dziś (TV Series) .... doorman Maurycy (final appearance)

Dubbing 
 1969 Zbrodniarz, który ukradł zbrodnię - the voice of a "Polish courier"

Awards 
 Knight's Cross of the Order of Polonia Restituta in 2012 for outstanding achievements in artistic and creative work, for promoting democratic changes in Poland
 Złoty Mikrofon – 2006

References

External links 
 

1942 births
2021 deaths
Polish male film actors
Polish male stage actors
Polish cabaret performers
People from Świdnik County
20th-century Polish male actors
21st-century Polish male actors
Recipients of the Order of Polonia Restituta